Callichroma velutinum is a species of beetle in the family Cerambycidae. It was described by Johan Christian Fabricius in 1775. It is known from Venezuela, the Guianas, central Brazil, the West Indies, Peru, and Bolivia.

References

Callichromatini
Beetles described in 1775
Taxa named by Johan Christian Fabricius
Beetles of South America